Kishchenko is a surname. Notable people with the surname include:

 Sergei Kishchenko (born 1972), Russian footballer
 Vitali Kishchenko (born 1964), Soviet and Russian actor

See also
 

Ukrainian-language surnames